Sir Durward Randolph Knowles (2 November 1917 – 24 February 2018) was a sailor and Olympic champion from the Bahamas. He won the gold medal in the Star class at the 1964 Summer Olympics in Tokyo, together with Cecil Cooke. He won the bronze medal in the same class at the 1956 Summer Olympics in Melbourne. He had previously competed for the United Kingdom in the 1948 Olympics finishing in 4th place in the Star class together with Sloane Elmo Farrington. Representing the Bahamas, Knowles also won gold in the 1959 Pan American Games star class (with Farrington). He is one of only five athletes who have competed in the Olympics over a span of 40 years, along with fencer Ivan Joseph Martin Osiier, sailor Magnus Konow, showjumper Ian Millar, and sailor Paul Elvstrøm.

Knowles was knighted in 1996. In 1997, he was awarded The Bahamas' Order of Merit. 

In 2014, the second Legend-class patrol boat of the Royal Bahamas Defence Force was commissioned as HMBS Durward Knowles. In May 2016, following the death of Sándor Tarics, he became the oldest living Olympic champion. He turned 100 in November 2017 and died on 24 February 2018.

See also
 List of centenarians (sportspeople)
 List of athletes with the most appearances at Olympic Games

References

External links

1917 births
2018 deaths
Bahamian centenarians
Sportspeople from Nassau, Bahamas
Bahamian male sailors (sport)
Olympic sailors of Great Britain
Olympic sailors of the Bahamas
Sailors at the 1948 Summer Olympics – Star
Sailors at the 1952 Summer Olympics – Star
Sailors at the 1956 Summer Olympics – Star
Sailors at the 1960 Summer Olympics – Star
Sailors at the 1964 Summer Olympics – Star
Sailors at the 1968 Summer Olympics – Star
Sailors at the 1972 Summer Olympics – Star
Sailors at the 1988 Summer Olympics – Star
Olympic gold medalists for the Bahamas
Olympic bronze medalists for the Bahamas
Olympic medalists in sailing
Star class world champions
Medalists at the 1956 Summer Olympics
Medalists at the 1964 Summer Olympics
Sailors at the 1959 Pan American Games
Pan American Games gold medalists for the Bahamas
Pan American Games medalists in sailing
World champions in sailing for the Bahamas
Deaths from kidney failure
Medalists at the 1959 Pan American Games
Men centenarians
People in sports awarded knighthoods